Normal Young Man is a 1969 Italian comedy film directed by Dino Risi.

It is based on the novel with the same name written by Umberto Simonetta.

Cast 
 Lino Capolicchio: Giordano 
 Janet Agren: Diana 
 Eugene Walter: Nelson 
 Jeff Morrow: Professor Sid 
 Umberto D'Orsi: Un automobilista 
 Claudio Trionfi: Mariolino 
 Pippo Franco: Claudio 
 Dana Ghia: La professoressa 
 Gino Santercole: Giorgio

References

External links

1969 films
Films directed by Dino Risi
Commedia all'italiana
1969 comedy films
Films with screenplays by Maurizio Costanzo
Films scored by Armando Trovajoli
1960s Italian-language films
1960s Italian films